The Islington Sewage Farm (also known as Tam O'Shanter Sewage Farm) was a sewerage treatment facility located at Tam O'Shanter Belt/Islington (now Regency Park) in South Australia, which operated from 1881 until 1966.

According to a 1996 heritage survey by the City of Enfield Islington Sewage Farm was claimed to be Australia's earliest "water borne waste disposal treatment system".

History
In 1879 land that is now Regency Park was acquired by the City of Adelaide for the purpose of constructing the Islington Sewage Farm. The sewage farm commenced operation in 1881. In 1948, a concrete watercourse was extended to North Arm Creek (Port River) and the post-war population boom saw the sewage farm overloaded and raw sewerage diverted to the North Arm Creek. Plans for a new sewerage works for Adelaide commenced in 1960 and the treatment of sewerage was relocated to the Bolivar Waste Water Treatment Plant at Bolivar,  to the north, in 1966. The Islington sewage farm was subsequently closed and the land fell into disuse. The new industrial suburb of Regency Park was created on the site.

From 1975 to 1981 parts of the former sewage farm were subdivided and sold off by the state government. The  former residence of the sewage farm manager, Sunnybrae Farm, was preserved and in 1981 was transferred to the City of Enfield and declared a Historic Conservation and Recreation Centre. The old farm buildings at Sunnybrae were restored by history enthusiasts in partnership with the council. The site now houses a function centre and includes a museum originally created by the local historical society.

Sunnybrae

Sunnybrae Farm Complex is a heritage-listed site in Regency Park, South Australia. The historic Sunnybrae homestead was once the official residence of the sewage farm's manager. In addition to the manager's residence, the historic complex also includes "Dairymen's Quarters, Cheese Room and Cellars, Stables, Cow Shed and Smoke House". It was only used for dairying and cheese production in 1882 to 1884, but continued to be used for depasturing stock and vegetable and fruit production irrigated by the processed sewage.

In 1990 the City of Enfield gave the Enfield & Districts Historical Society the Sunnybrae property to house a museum celebrating local history. The museum was officially opened in June 1995. In 2001, the society built the Sunnybrae Farm Federation Pavilion with the assistance of a $28,000 Commonwealth grant. The society conducted open days and other public activities from 2002 to 2008. The historical society was dissolved in July 2012 and the property changed into private hands. It became known as Sunnybrae Estate, a commercially-owned function centre.

Straining shed

The straining shed of the sewage farm was preserved from the 1970s land sale. As such the Islington Sewage Farm Straining Shed was state heritage-listed in 1984 because it represents "part of a comprehensive waste treatment process of the late 19th century." The building is also an example of how seemingly basic public infrastructure of the era was designed and built to be visually eminent and symbolic of civic pride.

References

History of South Australia
Sewage treatment plants in Australia
South Australian Heritage Register
1879 establishments in Australia
1966 disestablishments in Australia